Senator Abbott may refer to:

Ambrose Abbott (1813–1882), Maine State Senate
Amos Abbott (1786–1868), Massachusetts State Senate
Burroughs Abbott (1830–1905), South Dakota State Senate
Chauncey M. Abbott (1822–1863), New York State Senate
Frank Abbott (politician) (1828–1893)
Jack Abbott (The Young and the Restless), fictional member of the Wisconsin State Senate
Joseph Carter Abbott (1825–1881), United States Senator from North Carolina
Josiah Gardner Abbott (1814–1891), Massachusetts State Senate
Othman A. Abbott (1842–1935), Nebraska State Senate

See also
Leon Abbett (1837–1894), New Jersey State Senate